At Newport or Live at Newport could refer to a number of live albums recorded at the Newport Folk Festival or the Newport Jazz Festival:

At Newport '63, an album by Martial Solal
At Newport '63 (Joe Williams album), 1963
At Newport '63 (Lambert, Hendricks & Bavan album), 1963
At Newport (Cecil Taylor & Gigi Gryce album), 1957
At Newport 1960, an album by Muddy Waters
The Coleman Hawkins, Roy Eldridge, Pete Brown, Jo Jones All Stars at Newport, 1957
Count Basie at Newport, 1957
Dizzy Gillespie at Newport, 1957
Eddie Costa, Mat Mathews & Don Elliott at Newport, 1957
Ella Fitzgerald and Billie Holiday at Newport, 1958
Ellington at Newport, a 1956 album by Duke Ellington
Herbie Mann Live at Newport, a 1963 album by Herbie Mann
Live at Newport (Christian Scott album), 2008
Live at Newport (Eddie Harris album), 1970
Live at Newport, an album by Ian & Sylvia
Live at Newport (Joan Baez album), 1996
Live at Newport (John Lee Hooker album)
Live at Newport (The Kingston Trio album), 1994
Live at Newport (Lightnin' Hopkins album)
Live at Newport (McCoy Tyner album)
Live at Newport (Phil Ochs album), 1996
Live at Newport, an album by Reverend Gary Davis
Live at Newport '77, a 1977 album by the Toshiko Akiyoshi – Lew Tabackin Big Band
Live at Newport II, a 1977 album by the Toshiko Akiyoshi – Lew Tabackin Big Band
Miles & Monk at Newport, a 1964 album by Miles Davis and Thelonious Monk
New Thing at Newport, a 1965 album by John Coltrane and Archie Shepp
Nina Simone at Newport, 1960
The Oscar Peterson Trio with Sonny Stitt, Roy Eldridge and Jo Jones at Newport, 1957
Red Allen, Kid Ory & Jack Teagarden at Newport, 1957
The Ruby Braff Octet with Pee Wee Russell & Bobby Henderson at Newport, 1957
The Teddy Wilson Trio & Gerry Mulligan Quartet with Bob Brookmeyer at Newport, 1957
Ray Charles at Newport, 1958
Toshiko and Leon Sash at Newport, a 1957 album by Toshiko Akiyoshi and Leon Sash

Newport Jazz Festival: Live at Carnegie Hall, a 1973 album by Ella Fitzgerald
 Newport Jazz Festival (1958), an album by Duke Ellington
Newport '63, a 1993 album by John Coltrane

See also
Festival (1967 film), a documentary film about the Newport Folk Festival
Jazz on a Summer's Day, a 1959 documentary film set at the Newport Jazz Festival